The men's 4 × 100 m Medley Relay event for the 1976 Summer Olympics was held in the Canadian city of Montreal on 22 July. The United States used two different foursomes in the heats and final - each combination won the race and broke the world record.

Final

Heats

Heat 1

Heat 2

References

External links
Official Olympic Report

Swimming at the 1976 Summer Olympics
Men's events at the 1976 Summer Olympics